Safarabad may refer to:
 Safarabad, Ardabil
 Safarabad, Fars
 Safarabad, Kermanshah
 Safarabad, Kohgiluyeh and Boyer-Ahmad
 Safarabad, Aligudarz, Lorestan Province
 Safarabad, Khorramabad, Lorestan Province
 Safarabad, Kuhdasht, Lorestan Province
 Safarabad, Miandorud, Mazandaran Province
 Safarabad, Sari, Mazandaran Province
 Safarabad, Qom